Robert Raymond Arnoux (23 October 1899, in Lille – 13 March 1964, in Paris) was a French actor.

Selected filmography

 Hantise (1922)
 Napoléon (1927) - Un conventionnel (uncredited)
 Rive gauche (1931) - Alfred
 Le congrès s'amuse (1931) - Pépi
 Tumultes (1932) - Willi
 Côte d'Azur (1932) - Anselme Duval
 La perle (1932) - Jacques Surville
 Ma femme... homme d'affaires (1962) - Pierre
 Le truc du Brésilien (1932)
 La pouponnière (1933) - Jean Moreau
 Madame ne veut pas d'enfants (1933) - Félix Le Barrois
 Je te confie ma femme (1933) - Berger
 Une femme au volant (1933) - Le baron d'Arcole
 Liliom (1934) - Le tourneur (the Lathe Turner)
 Youth (1934) - Jean
 Antonia (1935) - Pali
 Le Contrôleur des wagons-lits (1935) - Le collègue d'Albert
 Whirlpool of Desire (1935) - Pierre
 Gangster malgré lui (1935)
 Merchant of Love (1935) - Léo
 Une nuit de noces (1935) - Gaston
 Madame Angot's Daughter (1935) - Pomponnet - Un coiffeur
 Stradivarius (1935) - Imre Berczy
 Princess Tam-Tam (1935) - Coton
 Bourrachon (1935) - Henri Mirguet
 The Dying Land (1936) - François
 Seven Men, One Woman (1936) - Le spéculateur Vauxcouleur
 La souris bleue (1936) - Rigaud
 Josette (1937) - Rémy Doré
 Enfants de Paris (1937) - L'oncle
 L'appel de la vie (1937) - Marmousot
 Boulot aviateur (1937) - Boulot
 Mademoiselle ma mère (1937) - Moreuil
 Balthazar (1937) - Boutrot
 Le plus beau gosse de France (1938)
 Visages de femmes (1939) - Saint-Ernest
 Extenuating Circumstances (1939) - Gabriel, the chauffeur
 Serenade (1940) - Chavert
 Pour le maillot jaune (1940) - Regrattier
 Chèque au porteur (1941) - Gaëtan
 Prince Charming (1942) - Ernest
 Croisières sidérales (1942) - Le banquier Antoine
 Frederica (1942) - Julien Blanchet
 Lettres d'amour (1942) - Monsieur de la Jacquerie
 Dorothy Looks for Love (1945)
 La femme fatale (1946) - Monsieur Coussol
 We Are Not Married (1946) - Camille
 Histoire de chanter (1947) - Barette
 Miroir (1947) - Leroy-Garnier
 The Revenge of Baccarat (1947) - Venture
 Rocambole (1947) - Ventura
 Fantômas contre Fantômas (1949) - Noblet
 Le bal des pompiers (1949) - Touvoir
 Between Eleven and Midnight (1949) - Rossignol
 At the Grand Balcony (1949) - Vuillemin
 Amédée (1950) - Mareuil
 The Atomic Monsieur Placido (1950) - Joe
 Les femmes sont folles (1950) - Gaston
 Mademoiselle Josette, My Woman (1950) - Panard
 Beware of Blondes (1950) - Le rédacteur en chef
 The Dream of Andalusia (1951) - Schnell
 El sueño de Andalucía (1951) - Schnell
 Bluebeard (1951) - Mathieu Les Grands Pieds
 The Night Is My Kingdom (1951) - Julien Latour
 Chacun son tour (1951) - Raoul
 Mon curé chez les riches (1952) - Cousinet
 Manina, the Girl in the Bikini (1952) - M. Moulon / Purzel
 Trois jours de bringue à Paris (1954) - Le commissaire
 Orient Express (1954) - Jean Tribot aka Mr.Davis
 Mon curé chez les pauvres (1956) - Cousinet
 Deadlier Than the Male (1956) - Bouvier
 La Traversée de Paris (1956) - Marchandot
 Les lumières du soir (1956) - Angelotti
 La garçonne (1957) - Sorbier
 Une nuit aux Baléares (1957) - Loulou
 Le triporteur (1957) - Le dirigeant
 Oh! Qué mambo (1959) - Chauvet
 Le caïd (1960) - Le directeur de la Socorep
 Bernadette de Lourdes (1961) - Docteur Douzous
 Arsène Lupin contre Arsène Lupin (1962) - Hector Martin (uncredited)
 Seul... à corps perdu (1963) - Le rédacteur en chef
 Black Humor (1965) - (segment 1 'La Bestiole')
 Les mordus de Paris (1965) - (final film role)

References

1899 births
1964 deaths
Mass media people from Lille
French male stage actors
French male film actors
20th-century French male actors